Robert Brancetour was a 16th-century English merchant who was a member of the court of Charles V, Holy Roman Emperor. He was attainted by Henry VIII who repeatedly tried to have Brancetour arrested, but was thwarted by Charles V's protection. Brancetour was an associate of Cardinal Pole.

References

People of the Tudor period
16th-century English people
16th-century merchants